The London-class ships of the line were a class of four second rates, designed for the Royal Navy by Sir Thomas Slade.

Design
The first ship of the class, was a 90-gun ship. When the second batch of three ships was ordered several years later, they were specified as being 98-gun ships. This was achievable without significant modifications to the design thanks to the earlier practice of not arming the quarterdecks of second rates, thus allowing for the addition of 4 guns per side.

Ships

Builder: Chatham Dockyard
Ordered: 28 September 1759
Launched: 24 May 1766
Fate: Broken up, 1811

Builder: Woolwich Dockyard
Ordered: 9 December 1779
Launched: 4 July 1788
Fate: Broken up, 1837

Builder: Deptford Dockyard
Ordered: 13 September 1780
Launched: 15 April 1786
Fate: Wrecked, 1799

Builder: Deptford Dockyard
Ordered: 10 December 1782
Launched: 3 May 1790
Fate: Broken up, 1839

References

Lavery, Brian (2003) The Ship of the Line – Volume 1: The development of the battlefleet 1650–1850. Conway Maritime Press. .
Winfield, Rif (2007) British Warships in the Age of Sail 1714–1792: Design, Construction, Careers and Fates. Seaforth Publishing. .

 
Ship classes of the Royal Navy
Ship of the line classes